Nathaniel Hawthorne School is a historic school building located in the Hawthorne neighborhood of Philadelphia, Pennsylvania. It was designed by Henry deCoursey Richards and built in 1907–1908. It is a four-story, "E"-shaped, reinforced concrete building clad in brick and in the Classical Revival-style. It an entrance with hooded limestone surround, terra cotta trim, limestone quoins, and an arched shaped parapet. The school was named for author Nathaniel Hawthorne.

The building was added to the National Register of Historic Places in 1986.

References

School buildings on the National Register of Historic Places in Philadelphia
Neoclassical architecture in Pennsylvania
School buildings completed in 1908
South Philadelphia
1908 establishments in Pennsylvania